Montoulieu may refer to the following places in France:

Montoulieu, Ariège, a commune in the Ariège department 
Montoulieu, Hérault, a commune in the Hérault department